Volociximab (also known as M200) is a chimeric monoclonal antibody jointly developed by PDL BioPharma and Biogen Idec for treatment of a variety of advanced solid tumors. It binds to and inhibits the functional activity of α5β1 integrin.

It is thought to reduce metastases. Early results show potential in renal cell cancers.

References

External links 
 Official website

Monoclonal antibodies for tumors